Galvinoxyl is a commercially available radical scavenger. It finds use both as a probe for studying radical reactions and as an inhibitor of radical polymerization. It may be synthesized by oxidation of the parent phenol with lead dioxide or potassium hexacyanoferrate(III). Its radical structure is confirmed by the loss of the O–H stretch in the IR spectrum and by electron spin resonance; it is stable even in the presence of oxygen.

References

Free radicals